FunTown Manjong is a board video game based on Mahjong released on January 28, 2009 for the Xbox Live Arcade. It was created by Taiwanese developer Funtown World Studios.

Gameplay
Classic gameplay: A clear scoring system and the standard 16-tile Mahjong rules provide a classic gaming experience.
Great visuals: The vivid audio and visuals keep you in the game, and give you the ability to change background images and tiles.
Easy to learn: The simple tutorial mode gives you all the information you need for those new to the game.

References

 
 
 
 
 
 
 
 
 
 

2009 video games
Mahjong video games
Video games developed in Taiwan
North America-exclusive video games
Xbox 360 Live Arcade games
Xbox 360-only games
Xbox 360 games